Chloroclystis analyta is a moth in the family Geometridae. It is found on Sumatra.

References

External links

Moths described in 1928
analyta
Moths of Indonesia